Sahtu (also Romanized as Sahtū) is a village in Surak Rural District, Lirdaf District, Jask County, Hormozgan Province, Iran. At the 2006 census, its population was 98, in 22 families.

References 

Populated places in Jask County